Tingachhia is a small locality in the township of Katihar in Bihar, India.

Tingachhia used to be a village but it is now part of Katihar municipality, within Ward No 44

The town is at a low elevation, and the landscape is crossed by dried streams. A natural drainage near the village is the Kathotia, which is dirty from sewage from the town. The Kosi canal passes near the village. Formerly much of the area was covered with Mango & Litchi orchards.

History
Tingachhia is a very old settlement located on the trade route from the Bihar plateau to Nepal. The origin of the name "Tingachhia" means the place with three trees. The traders used to rest in the shade of these three trees and hence the name. Initially the area was lightly populated and most of the land owned by Zamindars were used for cultivation. With the increase in population the locality grew. A jute mill was set up which is now known as Purana Jute Mill. At the same time there was a match factory, but it has since been closed down as the result of multiple fires. Tingachhia has been a trade centre for raw jute. In the 1960s and 1970s the Jute gola of Mangal Chand Jain supplied jute to the mills of Katihar and Calcutta.

The Government of Bihar set up two farms for the development of agriculture. One of the farms, known as Rajendra Jute Research Institute, is doing pioneering work in the area of jute cultivation. Under the aegis of the Government of India the Bihar government set up a Krishi Bazar Samiti (Agriculture Market Yard) for the marketing of agricultural produce in 1974. This samiti is the centre for trading of agricultural products for the entire Katihar district.

The godowns and offices of State Food Corporation and Central Ware Housing Corporation are located in the Bazar Samiti premises.

There is an office and centre of the Jute Corporation of India for the sale and purchase of jute.

Economy
The area is dotted with rice mills and large godowns. The people are mostly engaged in trading and transportation activities. A sizeable segment of the population is employed in education as there are schools and coaching institutes in the area. Many people are government employees.

The Bazar Samiti is a big trading centre for paddy and jute. The town is also a center for trading in  milk-giving livestock. High yielding animals are brought here from other parts of India and sold to the people of adjoining areas, including the province of West Bengal. The cost of living is cheap, particularly for fod. One can find fresh vegetables, fish, and pure milk at a very low prices. There are two firms which are engaged in manufacturing of agricultural equipments. These agricultural equipments are supplied to West Bengal and Nepal.

People and culture
Most of the people in the area are settlers from outside commensurate with the industrialization and trading activities. The earliest prominent employer was the jute mills. People mostly speak Angika and Hindi; however, at home they speak their own language like Bhojpuri, Mithili, etc. There is a sizable migrant population from Myanmar settled in the Burma Colony. Some refugees from Bangladesh have also chosen Tingachhia as their home.

Communication
Tingachhia is located at the southern fringe of Katihar Town. The main road is a highway that goes to Manihari. This highway bisects Tingachhia in an east–west direction, and is a very busy life line of the rural area. Travelers use this road to get from Manihari to Kaanwar during the month of Shravan to offer Ganga-Jal to Lord Shiva. During all pious occasions requiring bathing in the river Ganges this road becomes busier.

The locality is three kilometers southeast of the Katihar railway station. Rickshaws and hired cars and nowadays three wheelers, too, are also available at the railway station. The nearest commercial airport is Bagdogra. Telecommunication facilities are available in the locality. One can choose from a fixed line via  BSNL or mobile cell services of all the operators.

Cities and towns in Katihar district